Caldwell Blakeman Esselstyn Jr. (born December 12, 1933) is an American physician, author and former Olympic rowing champion.

Esselstyn is director of the Heart Disease Reversal Program at the Cleveland Clinic. He is also the author of Prevent and Reverse Heart Disease (2007), in which he argued for a low-fat, whole foods, plant-based diet that avoids all animal products and oils, as well as reducing or avoiding soybeans, nuts, and avocados.  The diet has been advocated by former U.S. President Bill Clinton.

Background 
Esselstyn was born in New York City in 1933 to Dr. Caldwell Blakeman Esselstyn Sr. and Lilian Meyer. Dr. Esselstyn's father was a prominent physician who was consulted by John F Kennedy for setting up Medicare and was the personal physician for Lou Gherig. His wife's father and grandfather, George Washington Crile and George "Barney" Crile, were notable surgeons who pioneered many medical innovations. 

Esselstyn graduated from  Yale University in 1956 where he was a member of Skull and Bones. He also competed in the 1956 Summer Olympics in Melbourne, winning a gold medal in the "eights" as a member of the American team.

Esselstyn received his M.D. from the Case Western Reserve University School of Medicine in 1961. During this time he met and married Ann Crile, the granddaughter of George Washington Crile, founder of the Cleveland Clinic. Esselstyn was an intern (1961–62) and resident (1962–66) at that clinic. In 1968 he completed a tour as an Army surgeon in Vietnam where he was awarded the Bronze Star. Upon his return he rejoined the clinic and has served as the President of the Staff and as a member of its Board of Governors. He served as the President of the American Association of Endocrine Surgeons in 1991. In 2000 he gave up his post at the Cleveland Clinic.

Esselstyn has served as a member of the Scientific Advisory Board of Nutrition Action magazine, published by the Center for Science in the Public Interest. Esselstyn is also on the advisory board of Naked Food Magazine, for which he is also a regular contributor of articles espousing a plant-based diet.

Diet work 

Esselstyn promotes a whole foods, plant-based diet, arguing it can prevent coronary disease and cardiovascular disease. The diet excludes all animal products and oils and recommends foods such as fruits, vegetables, whole grains, pulses, and especially cruciferous vegetables.

His work received media attention when former U.S. President Bill Clinton cited it, along with work by Dean Ornish and The China Study as the basis for his change of diet in 2010 and yet more in late 2011 when Clinton discussed his diet with CNN and other media outlets.

Esselstyn was also one of the doctors featured in the documentary films Forks Over Knives (2011) and The Game Changers (2018).

Esselstyn advised Eric Adams, the incoming mayor of New York City, to switch to a plant-based diet after Adams was diagnosed with diabetes. Within six months Adams had lost 30 pounds, reversed his diabetes, and reduced his blood pressure and cholesterol levels to a healthy enough range to lower his risk of heart disease or stroke.

With regard to Esselstyn's claims, Nancy Brown, CEO of the American Heart Association, said: "Diet alone is not going to be the reason that heart attacks are eliminated. Other key factors include physical activity, cholesterol, blood pressure and weight."

Harriet A. Hall has written that the claims made by Esselstyn are misleading and that the evidence on which they are based is "pretty skimpy".  Steven Nissen of the Cleveland Clinic said that his claims are unproven because there isn't data from rigorous clinical trials to support them.

Awards 
In 2005 Esselstyn received the Benjamin Spock Award for Compassion in Medicine (he was the award's first recipient), and in 2009 the Distinguished Alumnus Award from the Cleveland Clinic Alumni Association. In 2010 he received the Greater Cleveland Sports Hall of Fame Award.

Selected publications 

 Prevent and Reverse Heart Disease: The Revolutionary, Scientifically Proven, Nutrition-Based Cure. Penguin, 2007 
 The Prevent and Reverse Heart Disease Cookbook: Over 125 Delicious, Life-Changing, Plant-Based Recipes. Penguin, 2014

See also
 List of vegans

References

External links 

 
 
 

1933 births
Living people
American male rowers
American nutritionists
American surgeons
Case Western Reserve University School of Medicine alumni
Deerfield Academy alumni
Jewish American sportspeople
Medalists at the 1956 Summer Olympics
Olympic gold medalists for the United States in rowing
Plant-based diet advocates
Rowers at the 1956 Summer Olympics
Sportspeople from New York City
Yale University alumni
20th-century American physicians
20th-century surgeons
Physicians from New York City
21st-century American Jews
Vegan cookbook writers